Taizi Changqin or Prince Changqin is a deity in Chinese religion. He is the only son of the fire god Zhurong and was the first musician in the Three Realms. He appears in the Classic of Mountains and Seas and Commentary of Zuo.

Legends
According to the Classic of Mountains and Seas, Zhurong is a good-tempered god of fire and the south. His firstborn son, Changqin, was expected to succeed him as ruler, and was therefore given the title of crown prince.

Changqin was holding a guqin in his arms when he was born. He made his home on Yao Mountain, invented wind music, and became universally popular. The prince's music drew three five-colored birds to dance in the court: the imperial bird, the luan, and the phoenix.

In the battle between Zhurong and Gonggong, Changqin helped his father extend the power of their tribe to the modern areas of Zhejiang and Jiangxi.

References

Citations

Bibliography

Chinese gods